Wings of Courage is a 1995 American-French drama film directed by Jean-Jacques Annaud and starring Craig Sheffer, Val Kilmer, Elizabeth McGovern and Tom Hulce. The 40-minute film was written by Annaud with Alain Godard. It was the first dramatic film shot in the IMAX format.

Wings of Courage is an account of the real-life story of early airmail operations in South America.

Plot
In 1930 South America, a small group of French pilots led by aviation pioneer Antoine de Saint-Exupéry (Tom Hulce) struggle to prove they can offer a reliable airmail service over the Andes. When one of the young airmail pilots, Henri Guillaumet (Craig Sheffer), crashes on such a flight in the Andes, a search is started. Henri has to try and get back to civilization on foot. Back home, his wife Noelle (Elizabeth McGovern) and colleagues start to fear the worst.

Cast

 Craig Sheffer as Henri Guillaumet
 Elizabeth McGovern as Noelle Guillaumet
 Tom Hulce as Antoine de Saint-Exupéry
 Val Kilmer as Jean Mermoz
 Ken Pogue as Pierre Deley
 Ron Sauvé as Jean-René Lefebvre
 Molly Parker as Jean's Dance Partner (uncredited)
 Ron Sauvé as Lefebvre (credited as Ron Sauve)
 Freddy Andreiuci as Young Pilot

Production
Wings of Courage was the first IMAX 3-D short film created to be projected on the world's largest screens, with a process that uses a wider film gauge, more intense light and a brighter screen (covered with five coats of silver). The 3-D glasses were also a new type, liquid crystal lenses that are controlled by radio waves with each lens blinking 48 times a second, in sync with the projected image.

Reception
For Roger Ebert', Wings of Courage is "... a technical, rather than an artistic achievement." In the review in The New York Times, Caryn James had a similar evaluation: "'Wings of Courage' is a swooping, old-fashioned adventure tale that uses flashy newfangled technology. The first fiction movie made for IMAX 3-D (the format that makes everyone wear oversized, goofy-looking goggles), this 40-minute film plays to the strengths of its 3-D technique. It's a winning ploy. Film critic Leonard Maltin considered Wings of Courage, "Beautiful scenery aside, this is a lumbering, boring true-life adventure ... Dramatically speaking, it's about as lively as a 1930s Monogram programmer.

References

Notes

Bibliography

 Maltin, Leonard. Leonard Maltin's 2012 Movie Guide. New York: Signet, 2011. .

External links
 
 

1995 films
1995 short films
American short films
Antoine de Saint-Exupéry
Films set in 1930
French aviation films
1990s English-language films
Films scored by Gabriel Yared
Films directed by Jean-Jacques Annaud
French short films
IMAX short films
Sony Pictures Classics films
American aviation films
Biographical films about aviators
1990s American films
1990s French films